Abell 569 is a galaxy cluster in the northern constellation of Lynx. It is organized into two primary condensations that are separated by about 1.5 Mpc, and is probably a member of the Perseus Supercluster. The brightest galaxy in the cluster is NGC 2329, a giant elliptical galaxy of type D that is associated with a radio and X-ray source.

References

Lynx (constellation)
569
Galaxy clusters